Volvarina deliciosa is a species of sea snail, a marine gastropod mollusk in the family Marginellidae, the margin snails.

Description

Distribution

References

External links
 Photographs, Natural History Museum Rotterdam
 Photographs, Gastropods.com
 More Photos, Gastropods.com
 GBIF.org database entries, some aliases listed.

Marginellidae
Gastropods described in 1913